John Harrison (23 October 1924 – 1 February 2012) was an Australian rower. He competed at the 1956 Summer Olympics.

References

1924 births
2012 deaths
Australian male rowers
Olympic rowers of Australia
Rowers at the 1956 Summer Olympics
20th-century Australian people